Vasilyevo (Vasil) is an urban locality (an urban-type settlement) in Zelenodolsky District of the Republic of Tatarstan, Russia, located on the left bank of the Volga River (Kuybyshev Reservoir),  east of Zelenodolsk, the administrative center of the district. As of the 2010 Census, its population was 16,953.

History
It was established in the 17th century and was granted urban-type settlement status in 1928.

Administrative and municipal status
Within the framework of administrative divisions, the urban-type settlement of Vasilyevo is subordinated to Zelenodolsky District. As a municipal division, Vasilyevo is incorporated within Zelenodolsky Municipal District as Vasilyevo Urban Settlement.

Economy and infrastructure
As of 1997, the major industrial enterprises in the settlement were a laboratory glassware and tools plant, a bakery, as well as various construction and timber factories. The settlement serves as a railway station on the Kazan–Kanash line.

Demographics

In 1989, the population was ethnically mostly Russian (69.0%), followed by Tatars (26.3%) and Chuvash (1.8%).

References

Notes

Sources

Urban-type settlements in the Republic of Tatarstan
Populated places established in the 17th century
Kazansky Uyezd